Casserly is a surname. Notable people with the surname include:

 Charley Casserly, American football executive
 Eugene Casserly, Irish-American politician
 James R. Casserly, American politician and lawyer
 Luke Casserly, Australian footballer
 Michael Casserly, Irish sportsperson
 Peter Casserly, Australian military personnel
 Patrick S. Casserly, Irish editor and writer